The XI Bomber Command was a formation of the United States Army Air Forces. It was assigned to Eleventh Air Force, and its last station was Shemya Army Air Base, Alaska, where it was inactivated on 31 March 1944.

History
Eleventh Air Force organized the 11th Bombardment Command (Provisional) on 1 March 1942.  The provisional unit was discontinued in March 1943 and replaced by a permanent unit, XI Bomber Command.  The command controlled primarily medium and light bomber units deployed to Alaska during the Aleutian Islands Campaign in conjunction with Eleventh Air Force.

Lineage
 Constituted as the XI Bomber Command on 4 March 1943
 Activated on 19 March 1943
 Disbanded on 31 March 1944

Assignments
 Eleventh Air Force, 19 March 1943 – 31 March 1944

Stations
 Adak Army Air Field, Alaska, 19 March 1943
 Amchitka Army Air Field, Alaska, 24 June 1943
 Adak Army Air Field, Alaska, 4 September 1943
 Shemya Army Air Base, Alaska, 3–31 March 1944

Components
 28th Bombardment Group, 19 March 1943 – 31 March 1944

References

Notes

Bibliography

 
 

11 Command Bomb
1943 establishments in Alaska
1944 disestablishments in the United States
Military units and formations established in 1943
Military units and formations disestablished in 1944